The Phalangeroidea are a superfamily of mammals that include the families Burramyidae and Phalangeridae, as well as the extinct families Ektopodontidae and Miralinidae. They are mainly representatives of the possum marsupials.

References

Possums
Taxa named by Oldfield Thomas